Ceallach ua Maílcorgus (died 999), Chief Poet of Connacht.

The Annals of the Four Masters record his death under the year 999. No surviving poems by him are known.

References

 http://www.ucc.ie/celt/published/T100005B/
 http://www.irishtimes.com/ancestor/surname/index.cfm?fuseaction=Go.&UserID=

People from County Mayo
People from County Galway
People from County Roscommon
10th-century Irish poets
999 deaths
Medieval Irish poets
10th-century Irish writers
Year of birth unknown
Irish male poets